General elections will be held in El Salvador in February and March 2024. In the first round on 4February 2024, Salvadorans will elect the president, vice president, and all 84 deputies of the Legislative Assembly. In the second round on 3March 2024, they will elect all 20 deputies to the Central American Parliament (PARLACEN) and all 262 mayors of the country's municipalities. It will be the first time that presidential and legislative elections occur concurrently since the 1994 general election.

Prior to the election, controversy arose when incumbent President Nayib Bukele announced his re-election campaign on 15 September 2022. While the country's constitution prohibits immediate re-election, in September 2021, the Supreme Court of Justice ruled that the president could run for immediate re-election. Various journalists and politicians have condemned Bukele's re-election bid as illegal and authoritarian, while many Salvadorans—both inside and outside the country—support his campaign.

In October 2022, the Legislative Assembly passed a law which would allow Salvadoran expatriates to vote in the election. Several opposition politicians have criticized the decision, claiming that it would lead to electoral fraud. In December 2022, Bukele suggested reducing the number of municipalities from 262 to 50, which has been criticized by lawyers, economists, and opposition politicians as gerrymandering and an attempt to consolidate the government's power. In February 2023, Ernesto Castro, the president of the Legislative Assembly, announced that Nuevas Ideas deputies were formally considering reducing the number of municipalities from 262 to 50 and the number of seats in the Legislative Assembly from 84 to 64.

Twelve political parties have been allowed by the Supreme Electoral Court (TSE) to participate in the election. Both the right-wing Nationalist Republican Alliance (ARENA) and the left-wing Farabundo Martí National Liberation Front (FMLN), which formerly dominated Salvadoran politics in a two-party system, have declared that they will participate in the election and that they will not form a coalition with each other. Current opinion polls indicate significant leads for Nuevas Ideas in the presidential, legislative, and municipal races.

Electoral system

Election procedure 

General elections are scheduled to be held in El Salvador in 2024, five years after the 2019 presidential election and three years after the 2021 legislative election. The president, vice president, 84 deputies of the Legislative Assembly, 20 deputies of the Central American Parliament (PARLACEN), and 262 mayors of the country's municipalities will be elected through a popular vote. The constitution of El Salvador mandates that the election will be "free, direct, equal and secret". On 11 August 2022, the Supreme Electoral Court (TSE) announced that the elections for the presidency, vice presidency, and the Legislative Assembly will be held on Sunday, 4 February 2024, and that the elections for the 262 municipalities and the Central American Parliament will be held on Sunday, 3 March 2024.

In the presidential election, a candidate needs an absolute majority (50%+1) to be declared the winner of the election. If no candidate receives an absolute majority, a second round between the two candidates with the most valid votes will occur within thirty days of the first round. 

Mayors, deputies of the Legislative Assembly, and deputies of the Central American Parliament are elected by open-list proportional representation. The 262 mayors are elected in one constituency each, the 84 deputies of the Legislative Assembly are elected in 14 constituencies for the 14 departments of El Salvador, and the 20 deputies of the Central American Parliament are elected from one nationwide constituency.

Presidential and vice presidential candidates must be at least 30 years old, legislative candidates must be at least 25 years old, and municipal candidates must be at least 21 years old. All candidates must be Salvadoran citizens by birth. Per article 38 of the Law of Political Parties (Ley de Partidos Políticos), at least 30 percent of a party's total candidates for the legislative, municipal, and PARLACEN elections must be women.

Electronic voting is scheduled to begin in January 2024.

Election financing 

In December 2022, TSE magistrate Noel Orellana estimated that it would cost between US$25 and 30 million to finance the expatriate vote for the 2024 election, but later revised the estimate to US$120 million. In February 2023, the TSE announced that the expatriate vote would cost US$70.6 million and the national election would cost US$89 million, for a total cost of US$159.7 million for the 2024 election. In March 2023, the TSE reduced its estimate to US$129.3 million and formally requested that amount from the Legislative Assembly. The Legislative Assembly approved the TSE's request on 15 March 2023, making the 2024 election the most expensive election in Salvadoran history.

Political parties 

Political parties must be registered with the Supreme Electoral Court to be able to participate in the elections. The TSE mandated that the parties announce their internal party leadership elections and 2024 primary elections by 5 March 2023, and that they must hold them by 5 July 2023. Twelve political parties are eligible to participate, an increase of two from 2021. The twelve political parties are:

Additionally, two political movements, Citizen Power (PC) and Solidarity Force (FS), attempted to register with the TSE to gain political party status and to run in the 2024 election, but both parties failed to register before the 5 March deadline.

Registered voters 

Salvadoran citizens over the age of 18 living in El Salvador have until 7 August 2023 to register to vote, while those living outside of the country have until 5 November 2023 to register. On 1 March 2023, Guillermo Wellman, a magistrate of the Supreme Electoral Court, stated that individuals arrested during the country's 2022–23 gang crackdown were ineligible to vote. According to a poll conduced by La Prensa Gráfica in February 2023, around 68 percent of Salvadorans stated they definitely intended to vote in the 2024 election. 

The following table lists the number of registered voters for the 2024 election in all fourteen departments and outside of the country, as well as the number of seats in the Legislative Assembly and number of municipalities assigned to each department. The figures, as published by the Supreme Electoral Court, are accurate .

Political background

Presidency of Nayib Bukele 

Nayib Bukele, former mayor of San Salvador won the 2019 presidential election with 53 percent of the vote. He ran under the banner of the Grand Alliance for National Unity (GANA), making him the first president since José Napoleón Duarte (1984–1989) to not be a member of one of the country's two largest political parties (ARENA and FMLN). Bukele's election is considered to be one of the most impactful events in Salvadoran political history, as many politicians and journalists have described it as breaking the country's two-party system.

Throughout his presidency, Bukele's critics have called his governance authoritarian and autocratic. His COVID-19 lockdowns were criticized when more than 4,200 people were arrested by the National Civil Police(PNC). In February 2020, he was criticized for sending 40 soldiers into the Legislative Assembly in what critics called an attempted coup d'état. In September 2020, El Faro accused Bukele of negotiating with criminal gangs in the country, notably MS-13 and 18th Street, to lower crime rates. Bukele and his government have denied those accusations. The United States government has labeled various Bukele government officials as corrupt.

In the 2021 legislative election, Nuevas Ideas, the political party Bukele established, won supermajorities in the legislature, municipalities, and the Central American Parliament. The 13th session of the Legislative Assembly assumed office on 1 May 2022, and Ernesto Castro was elected as the president of the Legislative Assembly. Following Castro's election, the 64 deputies representing Nuevas Ideas, GANA, the Christian Democratic Party (PDC), and the National Coalition Party (PCN) voted to remove five Supreme Court justices from the constitutional court, including President , and Attorney General Raúl Melara. New justices and a new attorney general were later appointed by Bukele in what has since been described as a self-coup.

Following a spike in murders in March 2022, Bukele's government began a gang crackdown, referred to as a state of exception and a war against gangs, which has resulted in the reported arrests of 65,291 alleged gang members , and between 90 and 102 deaths in custody . The crackdown has been accused of engaging in arbitrary arrests, torture, and human rights abuses by organizations such as Amnesty International and Human Rights Watch. On 3 January 2023, Minister of Defense René Merino Monroy announced that 496 homicides were registered in 2022—a decrease from 1,147 homicides in 2021. Merino attributed the decrease to the gang crackdown.

Despite controversies and negative press coverage, Bukele remains extremely popular, with approval ratings consistently hovering between 80 and 90percent. He is considered to be one the most popular presidents in El Salvador's history, as well as one of the most popular current Latin American leaders.

Presidential re-election controversy 

On 3 September 2021, the Supreme Court of Justice ruled that the president of El Salvador is eligible to run for re-election consecutively, discarding a 2014 ruling that required presidents to wait ten years before running for re-election. The 2021 court ruling made Bukele eligible to run for president in 2024. Despite protests from ARENA and the FMLN, the Supreme Electoral Court accepted the Supreme Court's ruling. The United States embassy to El Salvador was critical of the Supreme Court's ruling, stating that it "undermines democracy".

During a speech on the country's 201st anniversary of independence from Spain on 15 September 2022, Bukele officially announced his re-election campaign. His announcement was criticized by constitutional lawyers, who said his re-election would be unconstitutional and in violation of at least four articles of El Salvador's constitution. Four former Latin American presidents—Vicente Fox and Felipe Calderón (Mexico), Óscar Arias (Costa Rica), and Mauricio Macri (Argentina)—criticized Bukele's announcement, stating it violated articles 16, 132, and 152 of the country's constitution. Bukele has been compared to Juan Orlando Hernández in Honduras and Daniel Ortega in Nicaragua, who used the Supreme Court and constitutional reforms, respectively, in their own countries to allow themselves to run for re-election. Carlos Araujo, a former 2021 ARENA deputy candidate, stated that there is "no doubt that President Bukele will be re-elected" (""), citing his high approval rating.

If Bukele wins re-election, he would be the first person since Óscar Osorio Hernández (1950–1956) to serve over five years as president of El Salvador, and the first person since Maximiliano Hernández Martínez (1931–1934, 1935–1944) to serve multiple terms as president. Additionally, he is the first president since Antonio Saca (2004–2009) to seek re-election. According to a poll conducted by Francisco Gavidia University in October 2022, 76 percent of respondents believed that if Bukele were re-elected in 2024, he would not run for a third term in 2029.

In mid-January 2023, TSE magistrate Noel Orellana announced that the court was drafting instructions and procedures regarding immediate presidential re-election. He stated that immediate re-election was a "new topic, something that has not occurred" (""). Vice President Félix Ulloa, who supports Bukele's re-election bid, suggested that Bukele should seek a license or express permission from the Supreme Court six months before the election. On 1March 2023, four of the five members of the Supreme Court's Constitutional Chamber confirmed that presidential re-election is allowed.

Allegations of fraud 

In August 2022, Bukele criticized the United States Federal Bureau of Investigation's (FBI) execution of a search warrant on Mar-a-Lago as hypocritical. He tweeted, "What would the US Government say, if OUR police raided the house of one of the main possible contenders of OUR 2024 presidential election?"

On 18 October 2022, the Legislative Assembly passed the Special Law for the Exercise of Suffrage Abroad, which allowed Salvadorans living outside of the country to vote electronically in the presidential and legislative elections, but not the municipal or PARLACEN elections. The Supreme Electoral Court announced on 17 November 2022 that it would guarantee the right of Salvadorans abroad to vote in the 2024 election. According to the TSE, 613,323 Salvadoran expatriates are eligible to vote in 2024. FMLN politician Rubén Zamora criticized the law, claiming that it was a "farce" ("") and would lead to voter fraud in the 2024 election. Ex-ARENA deputy Carlos Reyes, Vamos (V) deputy Claudia Ortiz, and Nuestro Tiempo (NT) deputy  also claimed that the law would allow the possibility of electoral fraud. Eduardo Escobar, the executive president of Citizen Action, claimed that electronic voting would allow a high risk of manipulation.

He said, "the opposition has started to say that there will be fraud, but we don't need to do that because we beat them when they were in control of everything" (""). On 18 January 2023, the Legislative Assembly passed a resolution to increase the criminal penalty for electoral fraud to 15–20 years in prison, higher than the previous penalty of 4–6 years. Additionally, if the individual was a gang member, the penalty was increased further to 20–30 years imprisonment.

On 16 February 2023, the Legislative Assembly passed a law making it illegal to impede the registration process for electoral candidates. According to the updated penal code, impeding a candidate's registration process is legally considered electoral fraud and will result in 6–20 years imprisonment. Lawyers and electoral experts alleged that the updated law would be used against those who opposed Bukele's re-election campaign; Eduardo Escobar and Ruth Eleonora López, the chief of Cristosal's anti-corruption committee, claimed that it was intimidation and a threat.

The Office for the Defense of Human Rights, a Salvadoran governmental agency, will be an observer for the 2024 elections. In March 2023, Votante, an voter's initiative created by five Salvadoran civil society organizations, petitioned the TSE to allow the United Nations, the Organization of American States, and the European Union to monitor the elections.

Proposed reduction of municipalities and legislative seats 

On 30 December 2022, Bukele tweeted that he believes the country's 262 municipalities should be reduced to only 50, claiming that it was "absurd that 21,000 km2 are divided into 262 municipalities". Claudia Ortiz stated that the reduction could be discussed after the country's 2023 census. Other opposition deputies claimed that the reduction of municipalities could lead to data being manipulated in favor of the government.

Meanwhile, various economists and lawyers claimed that the proposed reduction was an attempt by Bukele to consolidate his power through gerrymandering. Ruth Eleonora López stated that Bukele's proposal "leads to another twist in the concentration of power and centralization of decisions" (""). Eduardo Escobar claimed that the goal was to favor Nuevas Ideas by eliminating votes for opposition candidates, stating that it is "an artificial manipulation of electoral constituencies in order to generate an advantage" (""). Eugenio Chicas, an ex-magistrate of the Supreme Electoral Court, denounced the idea, saying:

Mario Durán, the mayor of San Salvador, supported Bukele's proposal to reduce the number of municipalities. GANA deputy Guillermo Gallegos also expressed his support, adding that he believed the number of seats in the Legislative Assembly should also be reduced. Gallegos said, "If re-election is possible, we can make all these changes" (""). Vice President Félix Ulloa supported reducing the number of seats in the Legislative Assembly, suggesting decreasing it from 84 to 50.

On 20 February 2023, Ernesto Castro confirmed that Nuevas Ideas was officially evaluating a proposal to reduce the number of deputies in the Legislative Assembly from 84 to 64, and the number of municipalities from 252 to 50. Castro stated that the country could function with 64 deputies, and that they propose a reduction to about 50 municipalities. The Legislative Assembly has had 84 seats since the 1991 legislative election, when 24 seats were added to the legislature. GANA deputy Numan Salgado supported the proposal and claimed that the country's population would support the reduction in deputies and municipalities. According to a poll conducted by Francisco Gavidia University in February 2023, around 48.5 percent of Salvadorans erroneously believed that El Salvador was already divided into only 50 municipalities.

Claudia Ortiz criticized the announcement, stating the proposed reforms could help Nuevas Ideas form a one-party system. She also argued that the time to make electoral reforms had passed and that the changes would be in violation of the electoral code, referring to Article 291-A, which prohibits electoral reforms up to one year before an election. The Legislative Assembly voted to repeal Article 291-A on 15 March 2023. Nuestro Tiempo deputy John Wright described the proposal as "extremely irresponsible" ("") for occurring within one year of the election.

Presidency

Declared candidates 

, only one candidate has officially declared his intent to run for president.

Potential candidates 

  Manuel Flores, former mayor of Quezaltepeque (2003–2012), former deputy of the Legislative Assembly (2012–2015)
  Javier Simán, 2019 ARENA presidential pre-candidate; president of the National Association of Private Enterprise (2020–2022); Owner of SIMÁN

Withdrawn candidates 

  Gerardo Awad, 2019 ARENA presidential pre-candidate
  Roy García, General-Secretary of PAIS (2022)

Declined candidates 

  Claudia Ortiz, deputy of the Legislative Assembly (2021–present)
  Mario Vega, senior pastor of Misión Cristiana Elim Internacional (1997–present)

Parliament 

Nuevas Ideas held a majority in the 13th Legislative Assembly; the Grand Alliance for National Unity, Christian Democratic Party, and National Coalition Party supported Nuevas Ideas' government. The opposition consisted of the Nationalist Republican Alliance, the Farabundo Martí National Liberation Front, Nuestro Tiempo, and Vamos. Within the Central American Parliament, the fifteen deputies from Nuevas Ideas and Grand Alliance for National Unity belong to the Center-Democratic Integration Group, the four deputies from the Nationalist Republican Alliance and the National Coalition Party belong to the Integrationist Democratic Unity, and the sole Farabundo Martí National Liberation Front deputy belongs to the Parliamentary Group of the Left.

Since the 2021 legislative election, three deputies and nine mayors from ARENA have left the party and become independents, and nine mayors from the FMLN have left the party and become independents.

Retiring deputies 

Three deputies of the legislative assembly have announced that they will not be running for re-election in 2024.

Electoral campaign 

The following table lists the electoral campaigning periods as defined by the Supreme Electoral Court. Additionally, the TSE has stated that it will not regulate campaigning outside of the country.

Nuevas Ideas 

Ernesto Castro has stated that Nuevas Ideas aims to win 70 seats in the Legislative Assembly and that the party does not intend to join a coalition with any other party. Estuardo Rodríguez, a Nuevas Ideas deputy in the Legislative Assembly, stated that the party expects to win all 24 legislative seats from the department of San Salvador. On 20 February 2023, in an interview with Telecorporación Salvadoreña's Frente a Frente, Castro announced that he was seeking re-election as a deputy, as were the majority of Nuevas Ideas deputies. Mario Durán confirmed in June 2022 that he was running for re-election as mayor of San Salvador.

On 18 February 2023, four Nuevas Ideas deputies—Edgardo Mulato, Alexia Rivas, Caleb Navarro, and Mauricio Ortiz—visited Uniondale, New York to meet Salvadorans from the U.S. states of Connecticut, New Jersey, and New York and to support Bukele's re-election campaign. On 25 February 2023, Castro and sixteen other Nuevas Ideas deputies held an event at a Church of Scientology center in Los Angeles, California. The event promoted Bukele's re-election to Salvadorans in Los Angeles. Eduardo Escobar of Acción Ciudadana claimed the event was illegal according to the constitution's rules about the promotion of candidates. Castro and thirteen other deputies met with Salvadorans in Houston, Texas on 18 March 2023.

The party will hold its internal and primary elections on 2 July 2023.

Nationalist Republican Alliance 

In March 2022, political analyst Walter Araujo believed that ARENA, the FMLN, and Vamos would form a coalition to challenge Nuevas Ideas in the presidential election. On 26 October 2022, Carlos García Saade, the president of ARENA, announced that the party would not join an alliance with the FMLN to defeat Bukele in the 2024 election. He stated that joining forces with the FMLN would "deteriorate both parties" (""), and that he wanted ARENA to be the alternative for Salvadorans who oppose Bukele. Although he ruled out a coalition with the FMLN, he was still open to forming a coalition or an alliance with other parties. In December 2022, García Saade stated that ARENA seeked to attain the "maximum number" ("") of deputies and mayors, but did not specify a clear projection.

The party was scheduled to hold its internal party leadership elections on 19 February 2023, but they were postponed to 26 February 2023 after the party's leadership stated there were problems in the electronic voting system. García Saade stated that ARENA would opt to vote with physical ballots rather than electronic ballots as a result; García Saade was re-elected as the party's president with 2,392 votes. ARENA's primary elections will be held on 18 June 2023.

Farabundo Martí National Liberation Front 

In September 2022, FMLN deputy Jaime Guevara stated that the FMLN has not resigned from its participation in the 2024 elections. Following the conclusion of the FMLN's 42nd Ordinary National Convention on 11 December 2022, Óscar Ortiz, the secretary-general of the FMLN, announced that the party would not join any coalition in the 2024 elections with Nuevas Ideas, or ARENA, or GANA, but the party would be open to forming coalitions with other parties. He said, "The FMLN is not only alive, but is paving the way for a new journey" ("").

The party plans to hold its internal elections in March 2023 and its primary elections on 11 June 2023.

Grand Alliance for National Unity 

, a deputy of the Legislative Assembly from GANA, stated that the party seeks to increase the amount of seats it has in the Legislative Assembly from five to fifteen. He also stated the party seeks to increase its number of mayors from 34 to over 100.

The party will hold its internal and primary elections on 2 July 2023.

National Coalition Party 
According to Manuel Rodríguez, the leader of the National Coalition Party, around 260 people will be running for office within the party. Rodríguez stated that the party seeks to increase the number of deputies in the Legislative Assembly from 3 to 9 and increase the number of mayors from 2 to 33.

The party will hold its internal and primary elections on 5 July 2023.

Christian Democratic Party 

The Christian Democratic Party will hold its internal and primary elections on 5 July 2023.

Nuestro Tiempo 

After John Wright announced his intention to not run for re-election as a deputy in 2024, four members of the party—Héctor Silva, Erick Iván Ortiz, Andy Failer, and Jeovanny Maravilla—expressed their interest in being elected in Wright's place.

Nuestro Tiempo held its internal elections on 12 March 2023; president Juan Valiente announced his retirement prior to the election and was succeeded by Failer. Its primary elections will be held on 25 June 2023. The party will not participate in the PARLACEN elections.

Vamos 

In March 2023, Ortiz announced her intention to be reelected as a deputy of the Legislative Assembly. On 5 March 2023, Vamos formally announced that it will not run a presidential candidate or compete in the PARLACEN elections.

The party will hold its internal and primary elections on 18 June 2023.

Other parties 

Roy García, the secretary general of the Salvadoran Independent Party, stated that the party sought to win between 20 and 25 deputies in the Legislative Assembly and between 90 and 100 mayors. The party will hold its internal elections on 9 April 2023, but García has claimed that the party will not hold elections and instead participate as a social movement in a coalition with another party; the party is seeking to ally with opposition political parties such as ARENA, the FMLN, Vamos, Nuestro Tiempo, or the Salvadoran Patriotic Fraternity.

The Salvadoran Patriotic Fraternity announced its internal and primary elections on 3 March 2023.

Democratic Change will hold its internal and primary elections on 4 June 2023. The party will not participate in the presidential election.

Salvadoran Democracy failed to announce its internal or primary elections before the 5 March 2023 deadline.

Solidarity Force, although not registered by the TSE as a political party, announced it will hold its internal and primary elections on 2 July 2023. Citizen Power also announced its internal and primary elections, but the TSE disregarded the announcement as invalid as they were not registered to participate in the 2024 election.

Opinion polls

Presidential opinion polls

Polling on Bukele's re-election 

According to polling conducted CIESCA and TResearch shortly after Bukele's announcement of re-election campaign, a large majority of Salvadorans support Bukele's re-election bid. Additionally, many Salvadoran Americans strongly support Bukele's re-election.

Legislative opinion polls

Municipal opinion polls

See also 

 Elections in El Salvador
 List of elections in 2024

Notes

References

Further reading

External links 

 Supreme Electoral Court website 
 Constitution of El Salvador 
 Election Guide 
 Electoral Code 
 Law of Political Parties 
 Special Law for the Exercise of Suffrage Abroad 

Presidential elections in El Salvador
Legislative elections in El Salvador
General election
El Salvador
Future elections in North America
Nayib Bukele